Challenge League may refer to:
 Challenge League (Japan), the third-level women's association football league in Japan
Swiss Challenge League, the second highest tier of the Swiss Football League
V.Challenge League (Japan), the second-level volleyball league for both men and women in Japan